Joram Shnider (born 30 October 1941) is an Israeli former swimmer. He competed in two events at the 1960 Summer Olympics.

References

External links
 

1941 births
Living people
Israeli male swimmers
Olympic swimmers of Israel
Swimmers at the 1960 Summer Olympics
Place of birth missing (living people)
Asian Games medalists in swimming
Asian Games silver medalists for Israel
Swimmers at the 1966 Asian Games
Medalists at the 1966 Asian Games